Yeoksam-dong is a ward of Gangnam-gu, Seoul, South Korea. Teheranno runs through Yeoksam-dong and has some of the tallest buildings in Seoul, comprising a collection of corporate headquarters and high-rise office buildings.

Economy
T'way Airlines has its headquarters in Yeoksam-dong. Pandora TV has its headquarters in the Seoul-Gangnam Building in Yeoksam-dong.

AMI Korea, a subsidiary of American Megatrends, is headquartered on the third floor of 773-6 Yeoksam-dong. Google has an office in Yeoksam-dong. Kukkiwon (the World Taekwondo Headquarters) is based at 635 Yeoksam-dong. Hankook P&G, a subsidiary of Procter & Gamble, is headquartered on the 16th floor of the ING tower at 679-4 Yeoksam-dong. C-JeS Entertainment is at 629-7 Yeoksam 1-dong. Pledis Entertainment is at 135-907 Yeoksam-dong.

 Renaissance Seoul Hotel

Education
Schools located in Yeoksam-dong:
 Seoul Yeoksam Elementary School
 Seoul Doseong Elementary School
 Yeoksam Middle School
 Jinseon Girls' Middle School
 Jinseon Girls' High School

See also

Korea
Dong of Gangnam-gu
Administrative divisions of South Korea

References

External links
Gangnam-gu map

Neighbourhoods in Gangnam District